Chlorogaster (literally  green stomach) is a genus of fungi thought to belong to the Sclerodermataceae family, but this has been not molecularly confirmed. A monotypic genus, it contains the single mycorrhizal species Chlorogaster dipterocarpi.

References

External links
 Index Fungorum

Boletales
Monotypic Boletales genera